Étienne Dolet (3 August 15093 August 1546) was a French scholar, translator and printer. Dolet was a controversial figure throughout his lifetime. His early attacks upon the Inquisition, the city council and other authorities in Toulouse, together with his later publications in Lyon treating of theological subjects, roused the French Inquisition to monitor his activities closely. After being imprisoned several times, he was eventually convicted of heresy, strangled and burned with his books due to the combined efforts of the parlement of Paris, the Inquisition, and the theological faculty of the Sorbonne.

Early life
Étienne Dolet was born in Orléans on 3 August 1509. According to tradition, he is the illegitimate son of Francis I, but it is possible that he was at least connected with some family of rank and wealth.

From Orléans he was taken to Paris about 1521, and after studying under Nicolas Bérauld, the teacher of Coligny, he proceeded in 1526 to Padua. The death of his friend and master, Simon de Villanova, led him, in 1530, to accept the post of secretary to Jean de Langeac, bishop of Limoges and French ambassador to the republic of Venice; he contrived, however, to attend the lectures of the Venetian scholar Battista Egnazio, and found time to write Latin love poems to a Venetian woman named Elena.

Writings
Returning to France soon afterwards he proceeded to Toulouse to study law, where he soon became involved in the violent disputes between the different nations (students being organized by nation of origin) of the university. As a result, he was thrown into prison and finally banished by a decree of the parlement. He entered the lists against Erasmus in the famous Ciceronian controversy (was Cicero the ideal exemplar of Latin prose or could one follow more fruitfully a variety of authors?) in which he took an ultra-Ciceronian stance. In 1535 he published through Sébastien Gryphe at Lyon a Dialogus de imitatione Ciceroniana. The following year saw the appearance of his two folio volumes Commentariorum linguae Latinae. This work was dedicated to Francis I, who gave him the privilege of printing, for a ten-year period, any works in Latin, Greek, Italian or French, which were the product of his own pen or had received his supervision. Accordingly, on his release from an imprisonment occasioned by his homicide of a painter named Henri Guillot, also called Compaing, he began his typographical and editorial labours at Lyon.

Cato christianus
He endeavoured to conciliate his opponents by publishing a Cato christianus, in which he made profession of his creed. The catholicity of his literary appreciation was soon displayed by the works which proceeded from his press: ancient and modern, sacred and secular, from the New Testament in Latin to Rabelais in French. But before the term of his privilege expired his labors were interrupted by his enemies, who succeeded in imprisoning him in 1542 on the charge of atheism.

Further imprisonment and death
After imprisonment for fifteen months, Dolet was released by the advocacy of Pierre Duchatel, Bishop of Tulle.  He escaped from a second imprisonment in 1544 by his own ingenuity, but, venturing back from Piedmont, whence he had fled in order to print at Lyon the letters by which he appealed for justice to the king of France, the queen of Navarre and the parlement of Paris, he was again arrested. He was branded as a relapsed atheist by the theological faculty of the Sorbonne. On 3 August 1546 (his 37th birthday), he was executed in the Place Maubert. On his way there he is said to have composed the punning pentameter  (Dolet himself does not suffer, but the pious crowd grieves).

Religious views
Whether Dolet is to be classed with the representatives of Protestantism or with the advocates of anti-Christian rationalism has been frequently disputed; by the principal Protestants of his own time he was not recognized, and by Calvin he was formally condemned, along with Heinrich Cornelius Agrippa and his master Villanova, as having uttered execrable blasphemies against the Son of God. The religious character of a large number of the books which he translated or published is sometimes noted in opposition to these charges, as is his advocacy of reading the Scriptures in the vernacular tongue.

Dolet has been referred to as an Anti-Trinitarian.

Legacy
The trial of Dolet was published (1836) by A.H. Taillandier from the registers of the parlement of Paris. A bronze statue of Dolet was erected on the Place Maubert in Paris in 1889; it was removed and melted down in 1942 during the German occupation of Paris.

References

Further reading
Picquier, Marcel, Etienne Dolet, 1509-1546: imprimeur humaniste, mort sur le bûcher, martyr de la libre pensée (nouv. ed., 2009)

Boulmier, Joseph, E. Dolet, sa vie, ses oeuvres, son martyre (1857)
Christie, Richard Copley, Étienne Dolet, the Martyr of the Renaissance (2nd ed., 1889), containing a full bibliography of works published by him as author or printer;
Didot, Ambroise Firmin, Essai sur la typographie (1852)
Galtier, O., Étienne Dolet (Paris, 1908).
Michel, L., Dolet: sa statue, place Maubert: ses amis, ses ennemis (1889)
Née de la Rochelle, J.F., Vie d'Éienne Dolet (1779)

External links
 
 

1509 births
1546 deaths
French classical scholars
French printers
French translators
People executed for heresy
People from Orléans
16th-century French businesspeople
16th-century executions by France
Executed French people
People executed by France by burning
Executed people from Centre-Val de Loire
French male writers